Sappy Records is an independent record label based in Sackville, New Brunswick, Canada, started by Julie Doiron in 1990 in order to release her own cassette.

The first 7" vinyl release was "Julie and the Porthole to Dimentia" in 1993, which featured a track each by the members of Eric's Trip.

In 1994, Jon Claytor and Julie Doiron became business partners and ran the label together until 2000.

The label lay dormant for a number of years after Julie Doiron won a Juno Award for Julie Doiron and the Wooden Stars in 2000, and subsequently signed to Endearing Records in Canada and Jagjaguwar internationally.  The label was restarted in 2006 by Julie Doiron, Jon Claytor and Paul Henderson.

Sappy Records also hosts the Sappy Records Music Festival (or SappyFest) in Sackville, New Brunswick, and has featured notable acts such as The Arcade Fire, Holy Fuck, The Acorn, Attack in Black, Chad VanGaalen, Old Man Luedecke, Ohbijou and Wintersleep. It takes place in the summer.

Roster
 Broken Girl
 Elevator
 Eric's Trip
 The Inbreds
 Julie Doiron
 Lonnie James
 Lousy
 Moon Socket
 Orange Glass
 The Peter Parkers
 Shotgun & Jaybird
 Snailhouse
 Thee Suddens
 Wooden Stars

Discography
SAP00A Orange Glass - Orange Glass (7")  
SAP001 Stereo Mountain - Julie And The Porthole To Dimentia (7", EP)  
SAP002 Broken Girl - Dog Love Part II (7")  
SAP003 Moon Socket - Moon Socket (cassette)   
SAP004 Moon Socket - Spaced-Odd-Ditties (7")  
SAP005 Elevator To Hell - Forward To Snow (7")  
SAP006 Broken Girl - Nora (7")  
SAP007 The Suddens - How Things Go (7")  
SAP008 Snailhouse - Snaihouse (7")  
SAP009 Broken Girl - Broken Girl (CD)  
SAP010 Orange Glass - Circle Dance (7")  
SAP011 Orange Glass - Meet The Robot (7")  
SAP012 Moon Socket - The Best Thing (CD)  
SAP013 Lousy - Lousy (7")  
SAP014 Elevator To Hell - Backwards May (7")  
SAP015 The Inbreds - Double Yolk (7")  
SAP016 Wooden Stars - Mardi Grad (CD)  
SAP017 Eric's Trip - Long Days Ride Till Tomorrow (CD)  
SAP019 The Peter Parkers - Evolve Or Be ... Kicked Out Of The Continuum (7")  
SAP020 Julie Doiron and the Wooden Stars - Julie Doiron and the Wooden Stars (CD)  
SAPPY001 Shotgun & Jaybird - There Are Days And Then There Are Days (CD, Maxi)  
SAPPY002 Shotgun & Jaybird - Trying To Get Somewhere (CD)

See also
 List of record labels

References

External links
 Sappy Records Label Site
 Sappy Records MySpace site

Canadian independent record labels
Record labels established in 1990
Indie rock record labels
Companies based in New Brunswick